Miss Europe 1929 was the second annual Miss Europe pageant and the first under French journalist Maurice de Waleffe. Maurice de Waleffe also created in 1920, what in 1927 had become the Miss France pageant. Miss Hungary, Böske Simon, won the pageant title and became the first Jewish women to be crowned Miss Europe. Eighteen European girls competed.

Results

Placements

Contestants

 - Lisl Goldarbeiter
 - Luba Yotzoff
 - Vibeke Mogensen
 -  Benny Dick
 - Germaine Laborde 
 - Elisabeth Yvette Rodzyn
 - Aspasie Karatja
 - Johanna Koopman 
 - Elzbieta "Böske" Simon

 - Clara Russell-Stritch
 - Derna Giovannini
 - Ketty Hipp
 - Władysława Kostakówna
 - Marioara Cranescu
 (In exile)-  Irina Levitskaya
 -  Pepita Samper Bono 
 - Annie Haussel
 - Stanislava Matijevitch

Notes
Miss Austria, Lisl Goldarbeiter, also competed at the International Pageant of Pulchritude 1929; where she won. Misses England, France, Holland, and Luxembourg also competed, but did not place.

References

External links 
 

Miss Europe
1929 in Europe
1929 beauty pageants
Beauty pageants in France